In enzymology, an arabinose isomerase is an enzyme that catalyzes the chemical reaction

D-arabinose  D-ribulose

Hence, this enzyme has one substrate, D-arabinose, and one product, D-ribulose.

This enzyme belongs to the family of isomerases, specifically those intramolecular oxidoreductases interconverting aldoses and ketoses.  The systematic name of this enzyme class is D-arabinose aldose-ketose-isomerase. Other names in common use include D-arabinose(L-fucose) isomerase, D-arabinose isomerase, L-fucose isomerase, and D-arabinose ketol-isomerase.

Structural studies

As of late 2007, only one structure has been solved for this class of enzymes, with the PDB accession code .

References

 
 

EC 5.3.1
Enzymes of known structure